Corporate appointeeship is the name given in the UK to the process of an accredited organisation becoming the designated appointee to a person who is unable to manage their own finances. Corporate appointees are often local authorities in the UK and firms of solicitors or consumer advocate organisations that provide an appointeeship service when a suitable family member or friend is unavailable or lacking to take over the daily money management services and responsibilities of the person in need of an appointee.

Corporate appointees need to be approved by the Department for Work and Pensions as the appointee is responsible for receiving benefit entitlement payments on behalf of the individual representing. Corporate appointee services have been extended by the Money Carer Foundation that have served to highlight the lack of financial protection that often leads to the financial abuse of vulnerable individuals unable to manage their finances.

External links
 DWP appointeeship information
 Appointeeship and financial abuse reference point

Accounting in the United Kingdom